The Vicar of Wakefield, subtitled A Tale, Supposed to be written by Himself, is a novel by Anglo-Irish writer Oliver Goldsmith (1728–1774). It was written from 1761 to 1762 and published in 1766. It was one of the most popular and widely read 18th-century novels among Victorians.

Publication
Dr. Samuel Johnson, one of Goldsmith's closest friends, told how The Vicar of Wakefield came to be sold for publication: 

The novel was The Vicar of Wakefield, and Johnson had sold it to Francis Newbery, a nephew of John. Newbery "kept it by him for nearly two years unpublished".

The 1929 edition was illustrated by Arthur Rackham (1867–1939).

Plot summary

The Vicar – Dr. Charles Primrose – lives an idyllic life in a country parish with his wife Deborah, son George, daughters Olivia and Sophia, and three other children. He is wealthy due to investing an inheritance he received from a deceased relative, and he donates the £35 that his job pays annually to the widows and orphans of local clergy. On the evening of George's wedding to wealthy Arabella Wilmot, the Vicar loses all his money through the bankruptcy of his merchant investor who has left town abruptly.

The wedding is called off by Arabella's father, who is known for his prudence with money. George, who was educated at Oxford and is old enough to be considered an adult, is sent away to town. The rest of the family move to a new and more humble parish on the land of Squire Thornhill, who is known to be a womanizer. On the way, they hear about the dubious reputation of their new landlord. Also, references are made to the squire's uncle Sir William Thornhill, who is known throughout the country for his worthiness and generosity.

A poor and eccentric friend, Mr. Burchell, whom they meet at an inn, rescues Sophia from drowning. She is instantly attracted to him, but her ambitious mother does not encourage her feelings.

Then follows a period of happy family life, interrupted only by regular visits of the dashing Squire Thornhill and Mr. Burchell. Olivia is captivated by Thornhill's hollow charm; but he also encourages the social ambitions of Mrs. Primrose and her daughters to a ludicrous degree.

Finally, Olivia is reported to have fled. First Burchell is suspected, but after a long pursuit Dr. Primrose finds his daughter, who was in fact deceived by Squire Thornhill. He planned to marry her in a mock ceremony and leave her shortly after, as he had done with several women before.

When Olivia and her father return home, they find their house in flames. Although the family has lost almost all their belongings, the evil Squire Thornhill insists on the payment of the rent. As the vicar cannot pay, he is brought to prison.

A series of dreadful developments follows. The vicar's daughter, Olivia, is reported dead, Sophia is abducted, and George too is sent to prison in chains and covered with blood, as he had challenged Thornhill to a duel when he had heard about his wickedness.

Then Mr. Burchell arrives and solves all problems. He rescues Sophia, Olivia is not dead, and it emerges that Mr. Burchell is in reality the worthy Sir William Thornhill, who travels through the country in disguise. In the end, there is a double wedding: George marries Arabella, as he originally intended, and Sir William Thornhill marries Sophia. Squire Thornhill's servant turns out to have tricked him, and what the Squire thought to be a sham marriage of himself and Olivia is in fact valid. Finally, even the wealth of the vicar is restored, as the bankrupt merchant is reported found.

Structure and narrative technique
The book consists of 32 chapters which fall into three parts:
 Chapters 1–3: beginning
 Chapters 4–29: main part
 Chapters 30–32: ending

Chapter 17, when Olivia is reported to be fled, can be regarded as the climax as well as an essential turning point of the novel. From chapter 17 onward it changes from a comical account of eighteenth-century country life into a pathetic melodrama with didactic traits.

There are quite a few interpolations of different literary genres, such as poems, histories or sermons, which widen the restricted view of the first person narrator and serve as didactic fables.

The novel can be regarded as a fictitious memoir, as it is told by the vicar himself by retrospection.

Main characters

Charles Primrose
He is the vicar in the title, and the narrator of the story. He presents one of the most harmlessly simple and unsophisticated yet also ironically complex figures ever to appear in English fiction. He has a mild, forgiving temper, as seen when he forgives his daughter Olivia with open arms. He is a loving husband and a father of six healthy, blooming children. However, though he usually has a sweet, benevolent temper, he can sometimes be a bit silly, stubborn, or vain. For instance, he is obsessed with a particularly obscure, and not very important, matter of church doctrine. One of his "favourite topics", he declares, is matrimony, and explains that he is proud of being "a strict monogamist" (in the sense that he is opposed to remarriage of any sort and believes scripture allows only one marriage partner for a person's lifetime).  He tactlessly adheres to his "principles" in the face of a violent disagreement with the neighbour who was soon to become his son's father-in-law (who is about to be married a fourth time). He "...was called out by one of my relations, who, with a face of concern, advised me to give up the dispute, at least till my son's wedding was over." However, he angrily cries that he will not "relinquish the cause of truth," and hotly says, "You might as well advise me to give up my fortune as my argument." This is ironic, as he immediately finds out that his fortune has been unexpectedly reduced to almost nothing. This makes Mr. Wilmot break off the intended marriage with Mr. Primrose's son George and Miss Arabella Wilmot, and thus his son's happiness is almost shattered. He is sometimes proud of what he fancies is his ability at arguing, and often misjudges his family's supposed friends and neighbours. However, despite all his faults, he is affectionate, faithful, loving, patient, and essentially good-natured.

Deborah Primrose
Dr Charles Primrose's wife. She is faithful, if still rather independent-minded. She has some vanity of her own, however: she has a "passion" for clothes, and is seen making a "wash"  for her girls. She is also eager to see her daughters splendidly married, and this ambition sometimes blinds her. Dr Charles Primrose refers to her wife as "a good-natured notable woman; and as for breeding, there were few country ladies who could shew (show) more. She could read any English book without much spelling, but for pickling, preserving, and cookery, none could excel her." She is even prouder of her children than her husband, especially her beautiful girls.

Olivia and Sophia Primrose
Their father originally wished to name each after their aunt Grissel, but other considerations prevented him.  They are affectionate, generally dutiful daughters. Of his daughters, the vicar claims, "Olivia...had that luxuriancy of beauty with which painters generally draw Hebe; open, sprightly, and commanding ...
Sophia's features were not so striking at first; but often did more certain execution; for they were soft, modest, and alluring. The one vanquished by a single blow, the other by efforts successfully repeated...Olivia wished for many lovers, Sophia to secure one. Olivia was often affected from too great a desire to please. Sophia even represt (repressed) excellence from her fears to offend."
They both alike reflect their father's nature of being good-hearted, though prone to occasional fault; Olivia runs away with Mr. Thornhill in a rush of impetuous passion, and even the more sensible Sophia joins in with making "a wash" for herself and dressing up in fancy clothes.

Reception
In literary history books, The Vicar of Wakefield is often described as a sentimental novel, which displays the belief in the innate goodness of human beings. But it can also be read as a satire on the sentimental novel and its values, as the vicar's values are apparently not compatible with the real "sinful" world. It is only with Sir William Thornhill's help that he can get out of his calamities. Moreover, an analogy can be drawn between Mr. Primrose's suffering and the Book of Job. This is particularly relevant to the question of why evil exists.

The novel is mentioned in George Eliot's Middlemarch, Stendhal's The Life of Henry Brulard, Arthur Schopenhauer's "The Art of Being Right", Jane Austen's Emma, Charles Dickens' A Tale of Two Cities and David Copperfield, Mary Shelley's Frankenstein, Sarah Grand's The Heavenly Twins, Charlotte Brontë's The Professor and Villette, Louisa May Alcott's Little Women and in Johann Wolfgang von Goethe's The Sorrows of Young Werther, as well as his Dichtung und Wahrheit. Goethe wrote:

“Now Herder came, and together with his great knowledge brought many other aids and the later publications besides. Among these he announced to us the Vicar of Wakefield as an excellent work, with a German translation of which he would make us acquainted by reading it aloud to us himself.  … A Protestant country clergyman is, perhaps the most beatific subject for a modern idyl; he appears, like Melchizedek, as priest and king in one person.” The Autobiography of Johann Goethe, p. 368 ff.

Adaptations
A play The Vicar of Wakefield: A drama in 3 parts (1850) by Joseph Stirling Coyne.
Silent film adaptations of the novel were produced in 1910, in 1913, and in 1916.

In 1959 an Italian television series The Vicar of Wakefield was broadcast.

Composer Liza Lehmann composed a 1906 comic light opera The Vicar of Wakefield to a libretto by Laurence Housman.

Notes

External links

 
 The Vicar of Wakefield at Internet Archive and Google Books (scanned books original editions color illustrated)
 (plain text and HTML)
 

1766 novels
18th-century Irish novels
18th-century British novels
Sentimental novels
Works by Oliver Goldsmith
Books illustrated by Arthur Rackham
Novels set in England
Irish novels adapted into films